Mariana Caucota Castro (born 22 April 1994) is a Bolivian footballer who plays as a midfielder for the Bolivia women's national team.

International career
Caucota played for Bolivia at senior level in the 2018 Copa América Femenina.

References

1994 births
Living people
Women's association football midfielders
Bolivian women's footballers
Bolivia women's international footballers
People from Cercado Province (Tarija)